The Château de Ruthie is a castle in the commune of Aussurucq in the Pyrénées-Atlantiques département of France.

Construction took place at various times in the 11th, 15th, 17th and 18th centuries. It was listed as a monument historique by the French Ministry of Culture on 30 April 1925, giving protection to its internal decoration. It is the property of the commune.

See also
List of castles in France

References

External links
 

Castles in Nouvelle-Aquitaine
Pyrénées-Atlantiques
Monuments historiques of Nouvelle-Aquitaine